Harumi Yanagawa (柳川 春巳, Yanagawa Harumi) is a paralympic athlete from Japan competing mainly in category T11 long-distance events.

Harumi competed in both the 5000m and marathon in both the 1992 finishing in sixth place and 1996 Summer Paralympics winning the gold in the marathon at the 1996 games.  He also competed in the marathon in 2000 but in attempting to defend his title he could only manage sixth place.

Harumi is from Saga, Saga, Japan and currently operates an acupuncture clinic in Fukuoka, Japan.

References

Paralympic athletes of Japan
Athletes (track and field) at the 1992 Summer Paralympics
Athletes (track and field) at the 1996 Summer Paralympics
Athletes (track and field) at the 2000 Summer Paralympics
Paralympic gold medalists for Japan
Living people
Medalists at the 1996 Summer Paralympics
Year of birth missing (living people)
Paralympic medalists in athletics (track and field)
Japanese male marathon runners
Visually impaired marathon runners
Paralympic marathon runners